Cook County Board of Commissioners 5th district is a electoral district for the Cook County Board of Commissioners.

The district was established in 1994, when the board transitioned from holding elections in individual districts, as opposed to the previous practice of holding a set of two at-large elections (one for ten seats from the city of Chicago and another for seven seats from suburban Cook County).

Geography
In every incarnation since its inception, the district has covered portions of the South Side of Chicago and portions of its southern suburbs.

1994 boundaries
When the district was first established, the district represented parts of the South Side and Southwest Side of Chicago, as well as parts of the southern suburbs of Cook County.

2001 redistricting
New boundaries were adopted in August 2001, with redistricting taking place following the 2000 United States Census.

In regards to townships and equivalent jurisdictions, the district's redistricted boundaries included portions of the city of Chicago and portions of the Bloom, Bremen, Calumet, Rich, Thornton, and Worth townships.

2012 redistricting
The district, as redistricted in 2012 following the 2010 United States Census, strongly resembled the geography it took in its previous, 2001, redistricting.

The district included parts of Alsip, Blue Island, Calumet Park, Chicago, Chicago Heights, Country Club Hills, Dixmoor, Dolton, East Hazel Crest, Flossmoor, Ford Heights, Glenwood, Harvey, Hazel Crest, Homewood, Lynwood, Marhkam, Merrionette Park, Midlothian, Oak Forest, Olympia Fields, Park Forest, Phoenix, Posen, Riverdale, Robbins, and Sauk Village.

In regards to townships and equivalent jurisdictions, it included portions of the city of Chicago, and portions of  Bloom, Bremen, Calumet, Rich, Thornton, and Worth townships.

The district was 76.68 square miles (49,076.30 acres).

2022 redistricting
The district was redistricted following the 2020 United States Census. The district remained a majority Black district spanning across parts of the South Side of Chicago and parts of the city's southern suburbs.

Politics
The district was represented from its inception in 1994 through 2022 by Democratic commissioner Deborah Sims. She was succeeded in December 2022 by Democrat Monica Gordon.

List of commissioners representing the district

Election results

|-
| colspan=16 style="text-align:center;" |Cook County Board of Commissioners 5th district general elections
|-
!Year
!Winning candidate
!Party
!Vote (pct)
!Opponent
!Party
! Vote (pct)
!Opponent
!Party
! Vote (pct)
|-
|1994
| |Deborah Sims
| | Democratic
| | 
| | Lawrence Ragland
| | Republican
| | 
|Text style="background:#D2B48C | Elliott Fourte
|Text style="background:#D2B48C | Harold Washington Party
|Text style="background:#D2B48C | 
|-
|1998
| |Deborah Sims
| | Democratic
| | 75,008 (100%)
|
|
|
|
|
|
|-
|2002
| |Deborah Sims
| | Democratic
| |76,702 (100%)
|
|
|
|
|
|
|-
|2006
| |Deborah Sims
| | Democratic
| |74,988 (100%)
|
|
|
|
|
|
|-
|2010
| |Deborah Sims
| | Democratic
| |79,566 (90.38%)
| | Miriam Shabo
| | Republican
| | 8,471 (9.62%)
|
|
|
|-
|2014
| |Deborah Sims
| | Democratic
| |70,542 (100%)
|
|
|
|
|
|
|-
|2018
| |Deborah Sims
| | Democratic
| |81,711 (100%)
|
|
|
|
|
|
|-
|2022
| |Monica M. Gordon
| | Democratic
| |163,385 (91.35%)
| | Jason Decker
| | Libertarian
| | 6,005 (8.65%)
|
|
|

References

Cook County Board of Commissioners districts
Constituencies established in 1994
1994 establishments in Illinois